Lee Kwon (born 25 February 1974) is a South Korean film and TV director.

Filmography

As film director 
Cowardly Vicious (short film, 2002) 
Attack on the Pin-Up Boys (2007)
My Ordinary Love Story (2014)
Door Lock (2018)

As screenwriter 
My Ordinary Love Story (2014)
Timing (animated film, 2015)
Door Lock (2018)

As TV director 
Flower Band (2012)
Exo Next Door (2015)
Save Me 2 (2019)

As storyboard artist 
Memento Mori (1999) - directing dept
Take Care of My Cat (2001) - trailer
Surprise Party (2002)
Attack on the Pin-Up Boys (2007)

Music video 
Interview (2000)

Title design 
Love Exposure (2007)

References

External links 
 
 
 

1974 births
Living people
South Korean film directors
South Korean screenwriters